Dolichoderus indrapurensis is a species of ant in the genus Dolichoderus. Described by Forel in 1912, the species is endemic to Borneo and Indonesia.

References

Dolichoderus
Hymenoptera of Asia
Insects of Borneo
Insects of Indonesia
Insects described in 1912